The 2nd constituency of Szabolcs-Szatmár-Bereg County is one of the single member constituencies of the National Assembly, the national legislature of Hungary. The constituency standard abbreviation: Szabolcs-Szatmár-Bereg 02. OEVK.

Since 2014, it has been represented by Győző Vinnai of the Fidesz–KDNP party alliance.

Geography
The 2nd constituency is located in western part of Szabolcs-Szatmár-Bereg County.

List of municipalities
The constituency includes the following municipalities:

Members
The constituency was first represented by Győző Vinnai of the Fidesz from 2014, and he was re-elected in 2018.

References

Szabolcs-Szatmár-Bereg 2nd